The Neshoba County Fair, also known as Mississippi's Giant House Party, is an annual event of agricultural, political, and social entertainment held a few miles from Philadelphia, Mississippi. The fair was first established in 1889 and is the nation's largest campground fair. The event usually starts at the end of July and lasts a week.

History
The first fair was called the Coldwater Fair with roots in church camp meetings.

Families and some of their weirder friends coming to the Fair began camping on the grounds for the duration of the fair. In 1894 a pavilion was constructed and a hotel was built to accommodate visitors. Cabins began to replace wagons and tents and in 1898 the oaks were planted that shade Founder's Square today. The first cabins were simple one story structures with some being log cabins.

-Neshoba County Fair Committee, Neshoba County Fair "Mississippi's Giant House Party"  

One of the Fair's most well-known traditions (100 plus years) occurs during election season, when elected officials and candidates from across the state attend the fair to campaign.  A number of candidates have made appearances at the fair, including Ronald Reagan and John Glenn. Reagan's states' rights speech there, which opened his 1980 presidential campaign, has become a famous example of alleged dog-whistle racism in American politics. Commentators noted that it was a deliberate reactionary choice to start the campaign there and make the speech as the county was the notable site of one of the most infamous acts of racist violence during the 1960s Freedom Summer.
Iris Kelso, a Neshoba County native and a journalist in New Orleans, often wrote about the fair in her columns and later in her television commentary.

No fair was held in 1917–18, 1942–45 nor 2020.

References

External links
Neshoba County Fair official website
Neshoba County's website
Ronald Reagan's visit to the fair in 1980

Tourist attractions in Neshoba County, Mississippi
Fairs in the United States
Festivals in Mississippi